West Africa is an album by saxophonist Willis Jackson which was recorded in 1973 and first released on the Muse label.

Reception 

Allmusic rated the album with 3 stars.

Track listing 
All compositions by Willis Jackson except where noted.
 "West Africa" – 6:52
 "A House Is Not a Home" (Burt Bacharach, Hal David) – 5:15
 "Fungii Mama"  4:07
 "Don't Misunderstand" – 5:31
 "The Head Tune" – 9:22
 "I Love You Yes I Do" (Sally Nix, Henry Glover) – 4:13

Personnel 
Willis Jackson – tenor saxophone
Ted Dunbar – guitar
Mickey Tucker – organ, electric piano
Bob Cranshaw – electric bass
Freddie Waits – drums
Richard Landrum – congas, percussion
Sonny Morgan – percussion

References 

Willis Jackson (saxophonist) albums
1974 albums
Muse Records albums